Henry County Courthouse may refer to:

 Henry County Courthouse (Georgia), McDonough, Georgia
 Henry County Courthouse (Iowa), Mount Pleasant, Iowa
 Henry County Courthouse (Illinois), Cambridge, Illinois
 Henry County Courthouse (Indiana), New Castle, Indiana
 Henry County Courthouse, Jail, and Warden's House, New Castle, Kentucky
 Henry County Courthouse (Ohio), Napoleon, Ohio
 Henry County Courthouse (Tennessee), Paris, Tennessee